Cheng Wan-jung (born 22 February 1988) is a Taiwanese swimmer. At the 2004 Olympics, she competed in the 100 and 200 m butterfly, finishing in 34th and 25th place respectively.  At the 2012 Summer Olympics, she competed in the Women's 200 metre butterfly, finishing in 28th place overall in the heats, failing to qualify for the semifinals.  She also competed in the 200 m individual medley finishing in 31st place.

References

Living people
Olympic swimmers of Taiwan
Swimmers at the 2004 Summer Olympics
Swimmers at the 2012 Summer Olympics
Taiwanese female butterfly swimmers
Asian Games medalists in swimming
Swimmers at the 2010 Asian Games
Taiwanese female medley swimmers

1988 births
Asian Games bronze medalists for Chinese Taipei
Medalists at the 2010 Asian Games
21st-century Taiwanese women